Bongu may refer to:

Bongu language, a Rai Coast language spoken in Madang Province, Papua New Guinea
Bongu, tribe in Zungeru, Nigeria
Bongu (film), 2017 Tamil film